See also Bridgeport Correctional Center, Bridgeport, Connecticut

The Bridgeport Unit (or Bridgeport Correctional Center) is a private state prison for men located in Bridgeport, Wise County, Texas, which is operated by Management and Training Corporation under contract with the Texas Department of Criminal Justice.  

This facility was opened in August 1989, and a maximum capacity of 519 male inmates.  From 1989 through 2010 the prison was operated by the GEO Group.

References

Prisons in Texas
Buildings and structures in Wise County, Texas
Management and Training Corporation
1989 establishments in Texas